Winfield Township may refer to the following places:

 Winfield Township, DuPage County, Illinois
 Winfield Township, Lake County, Indiana
 Winfield Township, Scott County, Iowa
 Winfield Township, Osborne County, Kansas
 Winfield Township, Montcalm County, Michigan
 Winfield Township, Renville County, Minnesota
 Winfield Township, Union County, New Jersey
 Winfield Township, Stutsman County, North Dakota
 Winfield Township, Butler County, Pennsylvania

See also

Winfield (disambiguation)

Township name disambiguation pages